Drljević is a surname. Notable people with the surname include:

Ljilja Drljević (born 1984), Montenegrin and Serbian chess player,
Sekula Drljević (1884–1945), Montenegrin lawyer and separatist politician.

Montenegrin surnames
Serbian surnames